El Bingo – A Collection of Latin American Favorites is a Decca Records album of phonograph records by Bing Crosby of Latin American themed songs.

Reception
The Billboard review stated:
Packaging eight Latin lullabies which Bing Crosby cut in an earlier day, it all adds up to a likely El Bingo binge for the fans. A romantic ranchero, Crosby sings to Xavier Cugat's music for "Siboney, Hasta Manana, You Belong to My Heart" and "Baia". For the other two records in the set, it's the single spirited spin for "Alla En El Rancho Grande" with the Foursome adding their vocal harmonies and John Scott Trotter making the music just as spirited. Trotter frames the musical back for the pash "Amor" piping to complete the platter. For the fourth side, Crosby sings it in Spanish, with Victor Young conducting the orchestra, for "No Te Importe Saber", recognized as "Let Me Love You Tonight", and adds the English lyric for "Flores Negras", best remembered as "You're the Moment of a Lifetime". Color photo of the singer wearing a sombrero makes for an attractive cover page, with personal notes on the piper for the inside page."

Track listing
These songs were featured on a 4-disc, 78 rpm album set, Decca Album No. A-547.

Disc 1 (23547):A.  "Siboney"B.  "Hasta Manana"Disc 2 (23413):A.   "You Belong to My Heart (Solamente Una Vez)"B.   "Baia"Dis 3: (23914) :A.   "Allá en el Rancho Grande (My Ranch)"B.   "Amor", Disc 4 (23915) : A.  "No Te Importe Saber (Let Me Love You Tonight)" (sung in Spanish) B.  "Flores Negras (You're the Moment of a Lifetime)" (sung in Spanish)

LP release
The album was re-released as a 10" LP (DL 5011) in 1949.

References

Bing Crosby compilation albums
Decca Records compilation albums
1947 compilation albums
Spanish-language compilation albums